Lyubach , rural localities in Belarus and Russia, may refer to:

 Lyubach, Minsk Oblast, a village
 Lyubach, Kursk Oblast, a settlement
 Lyubach, Novgorod Oblast, a village